NUU Mobile is a company that specializes in the design and production of Android smartphones and related accessories. Established in 2010, it operates in over 40 countries and is headquartered in Irving, Texas, USA. The company offers a range of mobile communication devices to consumers worldwide.

History

NUU Mobile was established in 2012 as a joint venture between Sun Cupid Group, based in Hong Kong, and Noetic Inc., based in the United States. The company introduced its products to the global marketplace at this time.

NUU Mobile initiated an international expansion project in 2012, establishing offices in various locations including India, England, Netherlands, Japan, Indonesia, Kuwait, and Qatar. In 2015, the company opened a branch in Miami to aid in servicing Latin American markets.

In 2015, NUU Mobile introduced the connect i1 4G Hotspot to the market, entering the portable mobile network hotspot market. The device was recognized for its innovation and technology, receiving first place at the 2016 CTIA Super Mobility E-Tech Awards.

Products 
NUU Mobile is a company that specializes in original equipment manufacturing (OEM) for the mobile phone industry. They are involved in the design, development, and marketing of smartphones, tablets, and portable mobile hotspots. The company creates products that are sold through various channels in the mobile phone industry.

NUU mobile phones are powered by the Android operating system and typically fall within the mid-range price range.

Reviews and recognition 
PC Mag has praised NUU Mobile for their use of high-quality components in their X1 phone, which they describe as "an excellent value for unlocked Android phones." The X1 offers a balance between quality and affordability, making it a popular choice for consumers looking for a budget-friendly option.

In July 2015, Android Authority reviewed the NUU Mobile Z8, describing it as a solid, affordable mid-range smartphone with many positive features. However, the review also acknowledged that the device had some flaws. The reviewer suggested that many of these issues could be addressed through future software updates.

In a later review in 2015, The Mac Wizard noted that previous issues with the Z8 had been addressed through firmware updates. The company also stated that they plan to continue to release updates for security purposes.

In 2016, CNET recognized the NUU Mobile X4 as a noteworthy smartphone at the Consumer Electronics Show (CES). The device was included in their list of "Smartphones That Matter at CES 2016."

Community outreach and sponsorship 
In November 2015, NUU Mobile announced its sponsorship of the National Basketball Association's (NBA) Minnesota Timberwolves for the 2015-2016 season. The partnership aimed to increase brand visibility and reach a wider audience through association with the professional basketball team.

In May 2017, NUU Mobile collaborated with professional soccer player Ronaldinho to sponsor a street soccer tournament in the Wynwood neighborhood of Miami, Florida.

See also 
 List of mobile phone makers by country

References

External links 
 

Electronics companies established in 2010